Setoclavine is an ergot alkaloid.

References

Ergot alkaloids